The Citadel, previously known as Throstle Nest, is a football ground situated in Farsley, in the Metropolitan District of the City of Leeds in England, and is the current home of Farsley Celtic. It has a capacity of 3,900, 400 of which are seated. For the 2007–08 season Farsley Celtic agreed to let Leeds Met Carnegie also play at the ground.

History

Farsley played their first game at Throstle Nest against Frickley Colliery in 1948 after purchasing it from the local council soon after the war. The club had plans to upgrade the ground in line with their ambitions of achieving football league status, and attracting larger crowds from the wider Leeds area in the process. However, they were relegated after just one season in the Conference Premier (the highest division outside the Football League) and fell back into the Conference North. During the 2009–10 season, the club's debts mounted to £750,000 and they were finally wound up on 12 March 2010 and expelled from the Conference North.

Subsequently, Leeds City Council agreed to purchase Throstle Nest, preserving it for football use in the community. A reformed Farsley club returned to the ground in the 2010–11 season.

Layout
The ground consists of two stands. The Main Stand is situated on the south of the ground, and backs onto the club shop, changing rooms and the clubhouse. The West Stand, known by fans as the "Shed End" is the most popular for the loyalist Farsley supporters. Situated behind the goal, the opposition goalkeeper regularly endures banter from the home supporters. Both stands are covered and have very few obstructions. There are no stands at the North and East ends of the ground, however fans can stand in these areas unless restrictions or segregation are in force. The dugouts are located in the North end of Throstle Nest. 

Outside the ground there is an indoor sports arena, consisting of a gym and indoor sports pitch. Adjacent to this there is an outdoor pitch that is used regularly by minor local and junior teams.

References

Football venues in England
Sports venues in Leeds
Farsley Celtic F.C.
Sports venues completed in 1948